Associations Incorporation Act 1981 is an act of the Parliament of Queensland to regulate  the affairs of incorporated associations.

External links 
 Queensland Consolidated Acts

Queensland legislation
1981 in Australian law
1980s in Queensland